Bernice may refer to:

Places

In the United States
 Bernice, Arkansas, an unincorporated community
 Bernice, Louisiana, a town
 Bernice, Nevada, a ghost town
 Bernice, Oklahoma, a town
 Bernice Coalfield, a coalfield in Sullivan County, Pennsylvania

Elsewhere
 Bernice, Manitoba, Canada, a community
 Bernice, an Old English name for Bernicia, an Anglo-Saxon kingdom in the 6th and 7th centuries

Other uses
 Bernice (given name), including a list of persons and characters with the name
 Hurricane Bernice (disambiguation),  tropical cyclones in the eastern Pacific Ocean
 USS Mary Alice (SP-397), a patrol vessel originally a private steam yacht named Bernice

See also
 Berenice (disambiguation)